Johann Müller (Dresden, fl. 1640ca. 1670) was a German composer and organist.

He worked for the Elector of Saxony, and was a pupil of Marco Giuseppe Peranda.

Recordings
 On Friedens-Seufftzer und Jubel-Geschrey - Music for the Peace of Westphalia. Weser-Renaissance Ensemble Bremen dir. Manfred Cordes. cpo

References

1670 deaths
German classical composers
German Baroque composers
Year of birth unknown
17th-century classical composers
German male classical composers
17th-century male musicians